Sam Means is an American comedy writer.  He won three Emmy awards for his work on The Daily Show with Jon Stewart, and wrote for both 30 Rock and Parks and Recreation on NBC as well as all four seasons of Unbreakable Kimmy Schmidt.  Together with Robert Carlock, he created the upcoming Netflix animated show, Mulligan.

Means received his A.B. from Dartmouth College, and an M.Phil. in philosophy from King's College, Cambridge. He began his career as a cartoonist for The New Yorker and as a contributing writer for The Onion.

References

External links

Dartmouth College alumni
American television writers
American male television writers
Living people
Alumni of King's College, Cambridge
Year of birth missing (living people)